The Unified Modeling Language (UML) is a general-purpose, developmental modeling language in the field of software engineering that is intended to provide a standard way to visualize the design of a system.

The creation of UML was originally motivated by the desire to standardize the disparate notational systems and approaches to software design. It was developed at Rational Software in 1994–1995, with further development led by them through 1996.

In 1997, UML was adopted as a standard by the Object Management Group (OMG), and has been managed by this organization ever since. In 2005, UML was also published by the International Organization for Standardization (ISO) as an approved ISO standard. Since then the standard has been periodically revised to cover the latest revision of UML. In software engineering, most practitioners do not use UML, but instead produce informal hand drawn diagrams; these diagrams, however, often include elements from UML.

History

Before UML 1.0 

UML has been evolving since the second half of the 1990s and has its roots in the object-oriented programming methods developed in the late 1980s and early 1990s. The timeline (see image) shows the highlights of the history of object-oriented modeling methods and notation.

It is originally based on the notations of the Booch method, the object-modeling technique (OMT) and object-oriented software engineering (OOSE), which it has integrated into a single language.

Rational Software Corporation hired James Rumbaugh from General Electric in 1994 and after that the company became the source for two of the most popular object-oriented modeling approaches of the day: Rumbaugh's object-modeling technique (OMT) and Grady Booch's method. They were soon assisted in their efforts by Ivar Jacobson, the creator of the object-oriented software engineering (OOSE) method, who joined them at Rational in 1995.

UML 1.x 

Under the technical leadership of those three (Rumbaugh, Jacobson and Booch), a consortium called the UML Partners was organized in 1996 to complete the Unified Modeling Language (UML) specification, and propose it to the Object Management Group (OMG) for standardization. The partnership also contained additional interested parties (for example HP, DEC, IBM and Microsoft). The UML Partners' UML 1.0 draft was proposed to the OMG in January 1997 by the consortium. During the same month the UML Partners formed a group, designed to define the exact meaning of language constructs, chaired by Cris Kobryn and administered by Ed Eykholt, to finalize the specification and integrate it with other standardization efforts. The result of this work, UML 1.1, was submitted to the OMG in August 1997 and adopted by the OMG in November 1997.

After the first release a task force was formed to improve the language, which released several minor revisions, 1.3, 1.4, and 1.5.

The standards it produced (as well as the original standard) have been noted as being ambiguous and inconsistent.

Cardinality notation 

As with database Chen, Bachman, and ISO ER diagrams, class models are specified to use "look-across" cardinalities, even though several authors (Merise, Elmasri & Navathe amongst others) prefer same-side or "look-here" for roles and both minimum and maximum cardinalities. Recent researchers (Feinerer, Dullea et al.) have shown that the "look-across" technique used by UML and ER diagrams is less effective and less coherent when applied to n-ary relationships of order strictly greater than 2.

Feinerer says: "Problems arise if we operate under the look-across semantics as used for UML associations. Hartmann investigates this situation and shows how and why different transformations fail.", and: "As we will see on the next few pages, the look-across interpretation introduces several difficulties which prevent the extension of simple mechanisms from binary to n-ary associations."

UML 2 

UML 2.0 major revision replaced version 1.5 in 2005, which was developed with an enlarged consortium to improve the language further to reflect new experience on usage of its features.

Although UML 2.1 was never released as a formal specification, versions 2.1.1 and 2.1.2 appeared in 2007, followed by UML 2.2 in February 2009. UML 2.3 was formally released in May 2010. UML 2.4.1 was formally released in August 2011. UML 2.5 was released in October 2012 as an "In progress" version and was officially released in June 2015. Formal version 2.5.1 was adopted in December 2017.

There are four parts to the UML 2.x specification:

 The Superstructure that defines the notation and semantics for diagrams and their model elements
 The Infrastructure that defines the core metamodel on which the Superstructure is based
 The Object Constraint Language (OCL) for defining rules for model elements
 The UML Diagram Interchange that defines how UML 2 diagram layouts are exchanged

Until UML 2.4.1, the latest versions of these standards were:
 UML Superstructure version 2.4.1
 UML Infrastructure version 2.4.1
 OCL version 2.3.1
 UML Diagram Interchange version 1.0.
Since version 2.5, the UML Specification has been simplified (without Superstructure and Infrastructure), and the latest versions of these standards are now:

 UML Specification 2.5.1
 OCL version 2.4

It continues to be updated and improved by the revision task force, who resolve any issues with the language.

Design 

UML offers a way to visualize a system's architectural blueprints in a diagram, including elements such as:

 any activities (jobs);
 individual components of the system;
 and how they can interact with other software components;
 how the system will run;
 how entities interact with others (components and interfaces);
 external user interface.

Although originally intended for object-oriented design documentation, UML has been extended to a larger set of design documentation (as listed above), and been found useful in many contexts.

Software development methods 

UML is not a development method by itself; however, it was designed to be compatible with the leading object-oriented software development methods of its time, for example OMT, Booch method, Objectory and especially RUP that it was originally intended to be used with when work began at Rational Software.

Modeling 

It is important to distinguish between the UML model and the set of diagrams of a system. A diagram is a partial graphic representation of a system's model. The set of diagrams need not completely cover the model and deleting a diagram does not change the model. The model may also contain documentation that drives the model elements and diagrams (such as written use cases).

UML diagrams represent two different views of a system model:

 Static (or structural) view: emphasizes the static structure of the system using objects, attributes, operations and relationships. It includes class diagrams and composite structure diagrams.
 Dynamic (or behavioral) view: emphasizes the dynamic behavior of the system by showing collaborations among objects and changes to the internal states of objects. This view includes sequence diagrams, activity diagrams and state machine diagrams.

UML models can be exchanged among UML tools by using the XML Metadata Interchange (XMI) format.

In UML, one of the key tools for behavior modeling is the use-case model, caused by OOSE. Use cases are a way of specifying required usages of a system. Typically, they are used to capture the requirements of a system, that is, what a system is supposed to do.

Diagrams 

UML 2 has many types of diagrams, which are divided into two categories. Some types represent structural information, and the rest represent general types of behavior, including a few that represent different aspects of interactions. These diagrams can be categorized hierarchically as shown in the following class diagram:

These diagrams may all contain comments or notes explaining usage, constraint, or intent.

Structure diagrams 

Structure diagrams represent the static aspects of the system. It emphasizes the things that must be present in the system being modeled. Since structure diagrams represent the structure, they are used extensively in documenting the software architecture of software systems. For example, the component diagram describes how a software system is split up into components and shows the dependencies among these components.

Behavior diagrams 

Behavior diagrams represent the dynamic aspect of the system. It emphasizes what must happen in the system being modeled. Since behavior diagrams illustrate the behavior of a system, they are used extensively to describe the functionality of software systems. As an example, the activity diagram describes the business and operational step-by-step activities of the components in a system.

Interaction diagrams 

Interaction diagrams, a subset of behavior diagrams, emphasize the flow of control and data among the things in the system being modeled. For example, the sequence diagram shows how objects communicate with each other regarding a sequence of messages.

Metamodeling 

The Object Management Group (OMG) has developed a metamodeling architecture to define the UML, called the Meta-Object Facility. MOF is designed as a four-layered architecture, as shown in the image at right. It provides a meta-meta model at the top, called the M3 layer. This M3-model is the language used by Meta-Object Facility to build metamodels, called M2-models.

The most prominent example of a Layer 2 Meta-Object Facility model is the UML metamodel, which describes the UML itself. These M2-models describe elements of the M1-layer, and thus M1-models. These would be, for example, models written in UML. The last layer is the M0-layer or data layer. It is used to describe runtime instances of the system.

The meta-model can be extended using a mechanism called stereotyping. This has been criticized as being insufficient/untenable by Brian Henderson-Sellers and Cesar Gonzalez-Perez in "Uses and Abuses of the Stereotype Mechanism in UML 1.x and 2.0".

Adoption 

UML has been marketed for many contexts.

It has been treated, at times, as a design silver bullet, which leads to problems. UML misuse includes overuse (designing every part of the system with it, which is unnecessary) and assuming that novices can design with it.

It is considered a large language, with many constructs. Some people (including Jacobson) feel that UML's size hinders learning (and therefore, using it).

See also 

 Applications of UML
 Business Process Model and Notation (BPMN)
 C4 model
 Model-based testing
 Model-driven engineering
 Object Oriented Role Analysis and Modeling
 Systems Modeling Language (SysML)
 List of Unified Modeling Language tools
 Department of Defense Architecture Framework
 MODAF
 DOT (graph description language)
 Process Specification Language

References

Further reading

External links 

 
 Current Version Specification

 
Architecture description language
Data modeling languages
Data modeling diagrams
Diagrams
Knowledge representation
ISO standards
Specification languages
Software modeling language
Modeling languages